Andrew J. Carn (born August 25, 1950) is a former Democratic member of the Pennsylvania House of Representatives.

He graduated from Thomas Edison High School in 1968 and earned a degree in electrical engineering from Howard University in 1973.

He was sworn in to represent the 197th legislative district in 1983, a position he held until the 2000 election, when he was defeated for the Democratic nomination by Jewell Williams

A Carn-controlled non-profit company, the 197 Plan Development Corp., was sued by the Department of Community and Economic Development for $40,000 in unaccounted for funds.

References

External links
 official PA House profile

1950 births
Living people
Democratic Party members of the Pennsylvania House of Representatives
Howard University alumni
Politicians from Philadelphia